Their Mutual Child is a lost 1920 American silent comedy film directed by George L. Cox and starring Margarita Fischer, Joseph Bennett and Margaret Campbell. It was based on the 1919 novel of the same title by P. G. Wodehouse.

Cast
 Margarita Fischer as Ruth Bannister 
 Joseph Bennett as Bailey Bannister 
 Margaret Campbell as Mrs. Lora Delane Porter 
 Nigel Barrie as Kirk Winfield 
 Harvey Clark as George Pennicutt 
 Andrew Robson as John Bannister 
 Beverly Travers as Mamie 
 Pat Moore as Baby William Bannister Winfield 
 Tom O'Brien as Steve Dingle 
 William Lloyd as Hank Jardine 
 William Marion as Percy Shanklyn 
 Stanhope Wheatcroft as Basil Millbank

Production
The film was directed by George L. Cox with Sidney Algier as assistant director.

References

Bibliography
 Goble, Alan. The Complete Index to Literary Sources in Film. Walter de Gruyter, 1999.

External links

1920 films
1920 comedy films
Silent American comedy films
Films directed by George L. Cox
American silent feature films
1920s English-language films
Pathé Exchange films
American black-and-white films
Films based on works by P. G. Wodehouse
1920s American films